N37 may refer to:
 N37 (Long Island bus)
 A37 motorway (Netherlands)
 , a T-class submarine of the Royal Navy captured in 1940
 , a Grampus-class submarine of the Royal Navy scrapped in 1947
 Monticello Airport (New York), in Sullivan County, New York, United States 
 Nudelman N-37, a Soviet aircraft cannon
 Wurrugu language